

References

Television technology
Display technology
CRT, LCD, Plasma, and OLED displays